The 2014 Big East Conference baseball tournament was held at MCU Park in Brooklyn, New York from May 21 through 25. The event, held at the end of the conference regular season, determined the champion of the Big East Conference for the 2013 season.   won the event for the first time and earned the conference's automatic bid to the 2014 NCAA Division I baseball tournament.

Format and seeding
The tournament used a modified double-elimination format and featured the top four finishers of the Big East's seven teams.

Bracket

All-Tournament Team
The following players were named to the All-Tournament Team.

Most Outstanding Player
Mitch Elliott was named Tournament Most Outstanding Player.  Elliott was an outfielder for Xavier.

References

Tournament
Big East Conference Baseball Tournament
Big East Conference baseball tournament
Big East Conference baseball tournament
2010s in Brooklyn
College sports in New York City
Baseball competitions in New York City
Sports in Brooklyn
College baseball tournaments in New York (state)